Sammanam is a 1997 Malayalam-language Indian feature film directed by Sundar Das, starring Manoj K. Jayan, Manju Warrier and Kalabhavan Mani in lead roles.

Cast
Kaithapram Damodaran Namboothiri as Thirumeni
Manoj K. Jayan as Appu
Manju Warrier as Rajalakshmi
Kalabhavan Mani as Abdu
Bindu Panicker
K. B. Ganesh Kumar
Kannur Sreelatha as Aminamma
Kaviyoor Renuka as Subhadramma
Mala Aravindan as Ramashan
Mamukkoya
NF Varghese as Vasudevan
Salu Koottanad as Shankarankutty
Vishnuprakash

Soundtrack
"Mampulli Marukulla" - Sujatha Mohan
"Devi Ennum Neeyen" - K. J. Yesudas, K. S. Chithra
"Poovaalthumbi" - K. J. Yesudas
Njalippurakkale" - Kalabhavan Mani

References

External links
 

1997 films
1990s Malayalam-language films
Films directed by Sundar Das
Films scored by Johnson